Diodora elizabethae is a species of sea snail, a marine gastropod mollusk in the family Fissurellidae, the keyhole limpets and slit limpets.

Description

The size of the shell reaches 45 mm.

Distribution
This marine species occurs off South Africa from False Bay to Southern KwaZuluNatal

References

External links
 To World Register of Marine Species
 

Fissurellidae
Gastropods described in 1901